Eulogy Recordings is an American  independent record label established in early 1997 by hardcore guitarist John Wylie. The record company was founded in Cooper City, Florida but its headquarters moved around in various parts of Broward County, Florida. Since its buy-out in 2018, it has been based in Atlanta, Georgia.

The label releases heavy metal and hardcore bands, some of which are straight edge. Among the label's better-known signings were Set Your Goals and New Found Glory. The first band signed to Eulogy Recordings in April 1997 was Bird of Ill Omen, which featured several members of Wylie's band Morning Again in its line-up. In 1999, Ian Rowan became a partner in Eulogy Recordings and later Hand of Hope Records. Eulogy Recordings also financed releases by its imprint label, Hand of Hope Records.

Eulogy has had exclusive distribution deals with both Good Life Recordings and Alveran Records for European distribution, and is currently distributed internationally by RED Music. On December 10, 2018, it was announced that Eulogy will be merged into the Stay Sick Recordings, a record label founded by Attila frontman, Chris Fronzak. With the acquisition, Eulogy Recordings moved its headquarters to Atlanta, Georgia.

Active roster
This list includes bands which are currently active on Eulogy.

Age of Ruin
American Sixgun
Atlantic Avenue
Barricade
Black My Heart
Brick By Brick
The Burning Season
Burn Infinite
Catalepsy
Creatures
Die Young
Empire
Hate Your Guts
Hoods
Kid Gorgeous
Homicidal
Knock 'em Dead
Lethal Skripturez
Life as a Ghost
Know the Score
Living Hell

Machinist!
Mass Graves
Nebraska Bricks
Nevea Tears
Nightlights
Reach For The Sky
Rhinoceros
Scatter Shot
Set Free
Shattered Realm
Stand United
Tell No Tales
The Mongoloids
The Offer
The Spotlight
The Tired and True
Through The Fire
Turmoil
Turncoat 
xTyrantx
Vice
We Still Dream
We Predict A Riot
Will to Live
Wisdom in Chains
Years Spent Cold

Past roster
This list includes bands which are no longer active on Eulogy.

200 North
Albert React
Arma Angelus
Bad Case of Big Mouth
Bird of Ill Omen
Bury Your Dead
By Autumns End
Calico System
Casey Jones
Christiansen
Culture
Dashboard Confessional
The Drama Summer
Ender
Evergreen Terrace
Fallen from the Sky
Forever and a Day
Glasseater
Hollowed Out
Kids Like Us
I Killed The Prom Queen
Keepsake
Kingdom

Morning Again
New Found Glory
On Broken Wings
On Watership Down
Red Letter Day
Paddock Park
Rosaline
Set Your Goals
Split Fifty
Summers End
Thick as Blood
This Day Forward
Trust No One
Twelve Tribes
Unearth
Unsung Zeros
Upheaval
Walls of Jericho
The Warriors
Where Fear and Weapons Meet

References

1997 establishments in Florida
Alternative rock record labels
American independent record labels
American record labels
Companies based in Florida
Hardcore record labels
Heavy metal record labels
Post-hardcore record labels
Record labels based in Florida
Record labels established in 1997
Eulogy Recordings